Mohammad Zubair may refer to:

 Muhammad Zubair Umar also known as Mohammad Zubair, Pakistani politician 
 Mohammad Zubair Khan, Pakistani economist 
 Mohammad Zubair (Pakistani cricketer), Rawalpindi cricketer
 Muhammad Zubair (field hockey), field hockey player
 Mohammed Zubair (journalist), Indian journalist and fact-checker

Pakistani masculine given names